Pâncești is a commune in Bacău County, Western Moldavia, Romania. It is composed of eight villages: Chilia Benei, Dieneț, Fulgeriș, Fundu Văii, Motoc, Pâncești, Petrești and Soci.

References

Communes in Bacău County
Localities in Western Moldavia